The World Rowing Coastal Championships is an official coastal rowing championship competition organised by World Rowing. The competition was first held in 2006 as the Rowing Coastal World Challenge and took official World Championships status in 2007, being held annually since the beginning (except 2012, 2020 and 2021). In this championships the endurance format is raced, with 4-6km races, in contrast with the World Rowing Beach Sprint Finals in which the head-to-head elimination style is raced, with a short sprint along the beach.

Venues

Medallists

Men

Singles

Pairs

Fours

Women

Singles

Pairs

Fours

Mixed

Pairs

References

 
 
 

Coastal
Recurring sporting events established in 2006
Rowing competitions